Daniel Stowe Botanical Garden is a botanical garden located on  of rolling meadows, woodlands and lakefront property in Belmont, North Carolina. Founded by Daniel J. Stowe, a retired textile executive from Belmont, it includes large manicured gardens, natural surrounding areas, including a woodland trail, sparkling fountains, and an Orchid Conservatory.

The appealing garden site has a long history of use by its inhabitants.  Originally, Native Americans of the Catawba and Cherokee tribes trapped, fished, hunted and raised families here.  Later, the area served as home to early European settlers.  In recent years, the garden’s meadowlands have been used as pasture for farm animals, although much of the site is covered by mature deciduous woodlands and pine forest.

Although a relatively new facility, Daniel Stowe Botanical Garden has a very old historical connection. The French botanist André Michaux rode and walked across the garden property in 1795. Michaux found new plants in Gaston County not far from the current garden, including the Bigleaf Magnolia.

More than 200 years later on this same farmland, the garden hosted the grand opening of  developed on October 9, 1999.  The opportunity to join as a founding member ended with 5,297 members.

Today, standing sentinel over the new area is the Robert Lee Stowe Visitor Pavilion, featuring pale yellow stucco walls fronted by 20 white Tuscan columns and topped with a copper roof.  Outside, guests find  complete with lush gardens, 12 sparkling fountains plus a ½ mile (800 m) woodland trail.

With 32 full- and part-time employees and more than 100 devoted volunteers, the garden continues to build recognition and its reputation.  HGTV named it one of the nation’s "20 Great Gardens", and USA Today proclaimed it one of the nation's top 10 places to "welcome fall with a flourish".

Development of the master plan will occur over the next several decades.  Future plans for the garden include a home demonstration garden, a boat water entrance with lakeside visitor center, a children's garden, a rose garden, a restaurant, and an Asian garden.

The Orchid Conservatory is the region’s only public conservatory devoted to the display of tropical plants.  Opened in January 2008, it features a wide range of plants that enable guests to learn about tropical ecosystems around the world.  Year-round the display will include a selection of orchids. Each winter, the garden presents its Orchid Spectacular.

The orchid conservatory makes the garden a true year-round facility, to serve not only the general public but schoolchildren around the region. Educational topics vary by the season and by the age group, but most focus on either horticulture and gardening or some aspect of life science or conservation.  The series of curriculum-based school programs, specifically designed for kindergarten to fifth-grade levels, meet goals established by the North Carolina Standard Course of Study. The garden also offers year-round special events and classes ranging from gardening and landscape to pottery and cooking with herbs.

See also 
 List of botanical gardens in the United States

External links 
 Daniel Stowe Botanical Garden

Botanical gardens in North Carolina
Charlotte metropolitan area
Protected areas of Gaston County, North Carolina
Buildings and structures in Gaston County, North Carolina
Tourist attractions in Gaston County, North Carolina
Woodland gardens